Kyiv School of Economics (KSE) is an undergraduate and graduate school of economics and management in Kyiv, Ukraine, founded in 1996 by the Economics Education and Research Consortium (EERC) and the Eurasia Foundation. KSE has an agreement with the University of Houston in the United States which permits it to grant graduates an MA in economics in their name as well. KSE programs are taught by twelve professors of economics who earned PhDs in US and European Union universities and are listed with UH faculty. The president of KSE is Tymofiy Mylovanov.

The mission of the school is building the intellectual foundation for a strong economy of Ukraine. Now the school has graduated more than 700 persons, 137 KSE graduates to earn PhDs from top Western universities.

Curriculum and Management 
The curriculum of the program is modeled on economic and financial programs in North America and Western Europe with English-language textbooks and access to modern world economic and scientific resources. Students have access to JSTOR and EBSCOHOST subscription scholarly archives. By arrangement, students of economic programs that have a grade "B" or higher at the end of the study, may also hold a degree from the University of Houston (USA), in addition to the KSE Diploma.

The best students on the rating have significant benefits in terms of tuition fees and the ability to become "teacher assistant" in the second year of study.

In addition to degree programs, the university has two centers:
 Centre for Excellence in Economic Journalism (Director is Andrii Ianitskyi, Ukrainian journalist).
 Centre of Excellence in Procurement
KSE is governed by its board of directors, which bears legal and fiduciary responsibility for the whole organization and oversees its activities. The board is chaired by Yegor Grygorenko, chair of the KSE Board; Manager, Bain & Company; KSE (EERC)’2001. The board includes several senior representatives of Western donor organizations and Ukrainian corporations. The members of the board meet every year and have separate discussions on successes and challenges in the KSE development.

The academic quality of the KSE MA Program is continuously overseen by the International Academic Board chaired Yurii Gorodnichenko, University of California, Berkeley, US. The head of IAB is also the member of the board of directors. One of the members of IAB is Roger Myerson. He was awarded the 2007 Nobel Memorial Prize in Economic Sciences in recognition of his contributions to mechanism design theory, which analyzes rules for coordinating economic agents efficiently when they have different information and difficulty trusting each other.

Degree programs

Bachelor's program 
 Bachelor's Program in Economics and Business (in cooperation with SSE Riga)
 Bachelor's Program in IT and Business Analytics
 Bachelor's Program in Economics and Big Data

Master's programs 
Three KSE Master's Programs are accredited by the Ministry of Education and Science of Ukraine: those in Economics Analysis, Business and Financial Economics, and Public Policy and Governance.  The university also offers a Master's in Mathematical Economics and Econometrics.

MBA 
Master of Business Administration

MBA for State-Owned Enterprises

Master of Business and Management in Artificial Intelligence and Data Analytics (MBAI+MBA)

PhD 
PhD in Agri Food Economics

KSE  and responses to the challenges of the war

Ukraine Humanitarian Relief Campaign by KSE 
From the very beginning of the war, KSE launched an international fundraising campaign aimed at Ukraine humanitarian relief . The KSETeam collects contributions, purchases, and coordinates all logistics for the delivery  of first aid kits and protective kits. Individuals and business all over the world support the campaign. Substantial donations made such companies as Jefferies, Ripple, PUMB, Kernel, УкрНафтоБуріння, U.COMMODITIES.

The campaign covers the following streams:
 Medical supplies (primarily, ambulance kits with stop-bleed items)
 Protective kits 
 Food and water for civilians

As of March 21, 2022, KSE has already raised more than $11.8 million for:  

 15400 first aid kits and prepay 20000 more 
 25000 tourniquets,  
 6350 safety vests,  
 3000 plates for locally produced vests and have available funding to secure additional 5000+,  
 5140 helmets, 
 other supplies (e.g. fabric for vests production, food supplies for cities under shelling).  

Among 18 batches in total, 6 are already delivered to Ukraine, 6 are on the way, 3 are being compiled for delivery and 3 have issues or had to be cancelled. Batches with issues are being resolved with the involvement of embassies when needed.  

KSE is committed to continue supporting Ukraine with supplying the critical supplies to those.

First batches with 5000 of aid kits are already going to Sumy, Kharkiv, Chernihiv, Mykolaiv. 500 completed bulletproof vests have already been delivered to Kharkiv. These bulletproof vests have plates of the 4th highest class. Also, the fund has already purchased an additional nearly 5,000 bulletproof vests to arrive in Ukraine next week.

Current demand for medical kits in Ukraine is 307,000 units. KSE procurement team follows closely the specifications of the benchmark kit, provided by the Ministry of Health of Ukraine, which is used by the Ukrainian armed forces in their emergency training. KSE is also working in close cooperation to get approval from the Ministry of Health on any deviations and analogues provided by suppliers.

As of March 20, KSE has already procured and delivered 5,400 medical kits at the total price of ca. USD 290,000. Additionally, 30,000 units of medical kits with improved specifications have been ordered and prepaid at the total price of ca. USD 2.2 million. These quantities are planned to be delivered to Ukraine in batches over the next couple of weeks. In addition, further volumes of 50,000 more units have been discussed with KSE's suppliers and are currently in the negotiations stage.

Military economy 
During the war KSE supports the Ukrainian government. KSE analysts assess the losses the effect of sanctions against Russia and develop economic post-war recovery scenarios.

Together with the Office of the President of Ukraine and the Ministry of Economy, KSE launched the Russia Will Pay project . Its purpose is to gather information about objects that have been destroyed and continue to be destroyed as a result of the war. This information will be used by the Ukrainian government as evidence in international courts to compensate Russia for the damage.

Scientific diplomacy 
KSE launched a cultural diplomacy project called Global Minds 4 Ukraine. These are the public lectures with top world intellectuals to demonstrate solidarity with Ukraine and enhance Ukrainian intellectual sovereignty. The outstanding scientists, scholars, and Nobel prize winners have already supported Ukraine, including Nassim Nicholas Taleb, Michael A. McFaul, Paul Krugman, David Howell Petraeus, Sander van der Linden, and Nicolas Cristakis .

Student life 
School students are actively involved in the formation of the agenda. Representatives of all long-term programs participate in the monthly meeting with the management team.

Students have organized Finance Club, Case Club, and Business Literature Club, which invite successful people to share their experience and give practical guidance on development.

There are several student competitions at the Kyiv School of Economics: Case Champ, Chess Champ and KSE BrainСhamp (the Olympiad). In autumn 2017, a student tournament "What? Where? When?" was launched.

Events 
The Kyiv School of Economics conducts a lot of open lectures, which can be visited by all those who wish. In the past few years, the speakers on such events were Oleg Ivantsov (editor in chief of Liga.net), Dag Detter, author of the book "The Public Wealth of Nations ", Aivaras Abromavichus, Minister of Economic Development and Trade of Ukraine (2014–2016), Dita Charanzova, member of the European Parliament, and other.

In 2018, KSE held two series of events named Ukraine Economy Week. In May – jointly with the National Bank of Ukraine. In September – together with the company ICU. Also KSE has started to publish yearly reforms overview – White Book on Reforms.

References

External links 
 Official website
 KSE Institute
 How To Donate To Ukraine Relief Efforts
 The challenges of delivering essential goods to Ukrainian cities under siege
 Russia Will Pay
 Global Minds 4 Ukraine

Universities and colleges in Kyiv
Business schools in Kyiv
Educational institutions established in 1996
1996 establishments in Ukraine